The Groupe de ravitaillement en vol 2/91 Bretagne or Air Supply Group 2/91 Bretagne is a unit of the French Air and Space Force specialized in missions of air supply. Implanted on an Aerial Base, the unit is equipped with Boeing KC-135FR Stratotanker and Boeing C-135FR Stratolifter tanker/transports.

Titled with 6 citations at the orders of the armed forces during the Second World War, the Bombardment Group Bretagne, which the group associates traditions which has been awarded the Fourragere of the war 1939-1945 at colors of the Order of the Légion d’honneur.

History 

The Bombardment Group Bretagne was created on January 1, 1942 at Fort-Lamy, in Tchad, from the permanent detachment of Aerial Forces of Tchad. Becoming the bombardment group - Groupe de Bombardement Moyen II/20 Bretagne, the latter took part to various World War II campaigns including the Fezzan campaign, Tunisia, Italy, the Liberation of Alsace and bombardments of Germany.

In 1946, the unit became a Transport Group, the group was numbered I/63 Bretagne in July 1947. The unit operated in Africa, until dissolution in 1963.

The bombardment squadron - Escadron de  2/91, created previously on December 1, 1964 at the corps of the 91e Escadre de Bombardement, retook the traditions of Bretagne. On April 1, 1965, the first Mirage IVA arrived to the squadron. After a drop on the firing field of Colomb-Béchar, the squadron was operational in July and integrated the ensemble plan of the nuclear force de dissuasion until dissolution, on July 31, 1996.
  
The first unit of the French Air Force to be equipped with means of air supply was the 90e Escadre on August 1963. Initially equipped with 12 C-135FR, the 90e Escadre de Ravitaillement en Vol (ERV) and the other air supply units were spread at the corps of 3 Mixed Escadres Bombardment Mirage IV/C-135FR in 1965. In 1976, the Air Supply Escadrons/Squadrons were united at the corps of the 93e Escadre de Ravitaillement en Vol until 1993.

On August 1, 1996, the Escadrons de Ravitaillement en Vol (ERV) 1/93 Aunis and 3/93 Landes were dissolved. The air supply means of these two squadrons were regrouped at the corps of a new ERV 93 Bretagne created the day. The unit became the only composition of the French Air Force to put into effect air supply means with C-135FR. The 2 Escadrilles of Landes (SPA Bi 54 and SAL 22) were preserved at the corps of ERV 93, as well as the traditional escadrille Rennes and Nantes.

On September 1, 2004, the ERV lost the designation of Escadron/Squadron to become a Group and was designated Groupe de Ravitaillement en Vol 00.093 « Bretagne ».

Since August 2009, the «Bretagne» has retaken the designation of Groupe de Ravitaillement en Vol 2/91

In 2012, the escadrilles Rennes', Nantes and SPA Bi were dissolved and replaced with three other units.

On August 27, 2014, the 31e Escadre Aérienne de Ravitaillement et de Transport Stratégiques was created on an Aerial Base. The latter regrouped GRV 2/91 Bretagne and the Specialized Technical Support Squadron (ESTS) 15/93.

Missions

The principal mission of this aerial unit is inscribed by the air support supply and transmissions of the Mirage 2000N and Rafale (F3) of the Strategic Air Forces.

Since 1980, the C-135 have participated to the following operations:

 Tchad : Operation Manta (1983), Operation Épervier,
 Gabon : Murène (1981/1982),
 Lebanon : Chevesne (1984),
 Saudi Arabia : Daguet (1990/1991), Alysse (1991),
 Turkey : ACONIT (1992/96),
  Bosnia and Herzegovina : Crécerelle, Salamandre (1993),
 Kosovo : Operation Trident (1999),
 Afghanistan : Enduring Freedom - Héraclès (2001/2002),
 Côte d'Ivoire : Opération Licorne (2002),
 Democratic Republic of the Congo : summer 2003.
 Libya : Harmattan (2011)
 Mali : Operation Serval (2013)

 Equipment

 11 C-135FRs, 12 purchased new from Boeing, first delivered in 1964. 1 was lost in 1972.
 3 KC-135RGs  purchased used from US Air Force stocks in 1997.

In 2014, it was announced that a demand for 12 Airbus A330 MRTT Phénix, one to two exemplary to be delivered by 2018 to replace 14 C-135 as well as other aircraft in the French Air Force.

 Successive denominations 

 Groupe de Bombardement Bretagne : (1942 to 1943)
 Groupe de Bombardement Moyen II/20 Bretagne : (1943 to 1944)
 Groupe de Bombardement II/20 Bretagne : (1944 to 1946)
 Groupe de Transport II/20 Bretagne : (1946 until July 1, 1947)
 Groupe de Transport I/63 Bretagne : (July 1, 1947 until 1963)
 Escadron de Bombardement 2/91 Bretagne : (December 1, 1964 until July 31, 1996)
 Escadron de Ravitaillement en Vol 94 Bretagne : (August 1, 1996 until September 1, 2004)
 Groupe de Ravitaillement en Vol 94 Bretagne : (September 1, 2004 until August 1, 2009)
 Groupe de Ravitaillement en Vol 2/91 Bretagne'' : ( since August 1, 2009)

See also 
List of Escadres of the French Air Force

References

Bibliography

Military units and formations of the French Air and Space Force